"Stand for Something" is the first single from Skindred's 2009 album, Shark Bites and Dog Fights, released as a digital download on Myspace on August 11, 2009.

Music video 
The video is mostly CGI animated in the fashion of the album art, and portrays Benji Webbe and Mikeydemus portraying Dictators, running speeches in a Hitler-esque fashion, while a Dogfight ensues between Benji's army and Mikey's army. At the climax, both leaders launch nuclear weapons and all the destroyed planes regenerate, and both sides are nearly annihilated. The video ends with Benji singing in the ruins of his city, while a few planes make the Peace Sign.

Track listing

Personnel

Musicians 
 Benji Webbe — Lead Vocals
 Daniel Pugsley — Bass, Programming, Backing Vocals
 Mikeydemus — Lead Guitar, Backing Vocals
 Arya Goggin — Drums

References 

2009 singles
Skindred songs
2009 songs